Upstairs and Downstairs is a 1959 British comedy film directed by Ralph Thomas and starring Michael Craig, Anne Heywood, Mylène Demongeot, Claudia Cardinale, James Robertson Justice, Joan Sims, Joan Hickson and Sid James. It features the first English-language performance of Claudia Cardinale.

Plot
Richard Barry marries Kate, the daughter of his boss, Mr Mansfield. Mansfield tells Richard that he needs to take over the entertaining for their firm. Richard decides this will require hiring some domestic help at home, but there then follows a series of very unsuitable servants. Eventually, he hires a young Swedish blonde woman, Ingrid, who is most competent and liked, not only by Richard and Kate and their two children, but also by their male friends. But Ingrid likes Richard...

Cast

 Michael Craig – Richard Barry
 Anne Heywood – Kate Barry
 Mylène Demongeot – Ingrid
 James Robertson Justice – Mansfield
 Claudia Cardinale – Maria
 Sid James – P.C. Edwards
 Joan Hickson – Rosemary
 Joan Sims – Blodwen
 Joseph Tomelty – Arthur Farringdon
 Nora Nicholson – Edith Farringdon
 Daniel Massey – Wesley Cotes
 Austin Willis – McGuffey
 Margalo Gillmore – Mrs McGuffey
 Reginald Beckwith – Parson
 Cyril Chamberlain – Guard
 Dilys Laye – Agency girl
 Irene Handl – Large woman
 William Mervyn – Kingsley
 Eric Pohlmann – Mario
 Jean Cadell – 1st Old Lady
 Barbara Everest – 2nd Old Lady
 Stephen Gregson – Paul
 Nicholas Phipps – Harry
 Jeremy Burnham – Frank
 Nicholas Parsons – Brian
 Madge Ryan – Policewoman
 Betty Henderson – Bridget
 Barbara Steele – Mary
 Susan Hampshire – Minor role
 Oliver Reed – Minor role
 Shirley Anne Field – Minor role
 Sam Kydd – Driver

Production
It was based on a 1957 novel by Ronald Scott Thorn, the pen name of Dr Ronald Wilkinson. Filming began in March 1959.

Ralph Thomas and Betty Box made the film after a series of more expensive adventure films. "I'm glad we're back in comedy", said Box. "I like to make people laugh. I think they get enough crying in daily life. Also the results in comedy are more tangible. You hear where you succeed."

Ralph Thomas later called the film "a light comedy which I liked very much... I had a great cast in that one... For its period it was a very effective, very small little comedy, which I think was really very funny."

Michael Craig said "the jokes and the situations were pretty much the same as in all the other Box/Thomas comedies. That's not surprising as they were mostly written by the same person and had the same casts."

Nicholas Parsons, who had a small role called it "a delightful domestic romp" where Demongeot "was incredibly sexy, and everyone fancied her like crazy." 

Sid James' eighteen month old daughter Susan appears in the film. James' biographer called the film a "glossy but empty-headed comedy... strangely out of touch for the late fifties." The ending of the film involves James' character announcing he has married a female colleague. Ralph Thomas said, "There is no way I could allow Sid to walk down the aisle. The public would never believe. it and besides that battered face just doesn’t go with a romantic role."

Release
Upstairs and Downstairs was one of seven Rank films bought for release in the US by 20th Century Fox.

Variety called it "simple, rather uneven, yet amiable."

References

External links

Upstairs and Downstairs at Britmovie

1959 films
British comedy films
1950s English-language films
Films directed by Ralph Thomas
Films shot at Pinewood Studios
1950s British films